Chemically Induced Dimerization (CID) is a biological mechanism in which two proteins bind only in the presence of a certain small molecule, enzyme or other dimerizing agent. Genetically engineered CID systems are used in biological research to control protein localization, to manipulate signalling pathways and to induce protein activation.

History
The first small molecule CID system was developed in 1993 and used FK1012, a derivative of the drug tacrolimus (FK506), to induce homo-dimerization of FKBP. This system was used in vivo to induce binding between cell surface receptors which could not bind in the normal way because they lacked the transmembrane and extracellular domain. Addition of FK1012 to the cells caused signal transduction.

Chemically induced dimerization systems

Applications
CID has been used for a number of applications in biomedical research. In most applications each dimerizing protein is expressed as part of a fusion construct with other proteins of interest. Adding the chemical dimerizing agent brings both constructs into proximity with each other and induces interactions between the proteins of interest. CID has been used to regulate and monitor gene transcription, signal transduction and post translational modifications in proteins.

Recently, CID has also been used to create a basic component of biocomputers, logic gates, from genetically manipulated cells. In this application, two independent CID systems, one based on plant proteins and one based on bacterial proteins are expressed in the same cell. Each set of proteins can be induced to dimerize by the addition of a separate chemical. By creating fusion proteins with the dimerizing proteins, membrane bound proteins and proteins that activate cell ruffling an AND gate and OR gate can be created that take chemical dimerizing agents as inputs and returns a ruffled or unruffled state as output.

References 

Biotechnology
Genetic engineering
Biochemistry methods
Protein–protein interaction assays
Cell biology